Shen Jong-chin (born 1951) is a Taiwanese politician. He was the Vice Premier of Taiwan since 19 June 2020 to 30 January 2023.

Education
Shen obtained his bachelor's degree in electrical engineering from Provincial Taipei Institute of Technology and master's degree in commerce automation and management from National Taipei University of Technology.

Political career
Shen led the Export Processing Zone Administration prior to heading the Industrial Development Bureau in 2012, succeeding Woody Duh. Shen became vice minister of economic affairs in 2014, again replacing Duh. He took office as deputy minister of economic affairs on 20 May 2016, with the Lin Chuan cabinet. He served as acting minister following the resignation of Lee Chih-kung in August 2017, and was retained by premier Lai Ching-te.

Anti-China movement in Vietnam
Responding to the destruction of Taiwanese companies operating in Vietnam due to the anti-China movement because of the China National Offshore Oil Corporation oil exploration in the disputed territories in South China Sea, Shen led a delegation to Vietnam to assist Taiwanese business people in the country in mid May 2014. They visited Bình Dương and Đồng Nai Province. The riot led to the damage of 224 Taiwanese companies and suspension of 1,100 Taiwanese enterprises.

Vice premiership
On 19 June 2020, Shen was appointed vice premier, succeeding Chen Chi-mai, who had resigned to contest the 2020 Kaohsiung mayoral by-election.

References

1951 births
Living people
National Taipei University of Technology alumni
Taiwanese Ministers of Economic Affairs